A dibling, a portmanteau of donor sibling, or donor-conceived sibling, or donor-sperm sibling, is one of two or more individuals who are biologically connected through donated eggs or sperm. The term is not favored among some donor-conceived people, who prefer the use of half-sibling.

People born from anonymous or ID release sperm or egg donation are able to find half-siblings conceived using the same gamete donor online through the Donor Sibling Registry or by using commercially-available DNA test kits. DNA testing is more accurate because it relies on comparison of single-nucleotide polymorphisms instead of gamete donor identification numbers (which may be erroneous).

See also
Accidental incest
Artificial insemination
Donor conceived person
Sperm bank

References

Fertility medicine
Sperm donation
Kinship and descent
Sibling